The 1978 Haringey Council election took place on 4 May 1978 to elect members of Haringey London Borough Council in London, England. The whole council was up for election and the Labour party stayed in overall control of the council.

Background

Election result

Ward results

Alexandra

Archway

Bowes Park

Bruce Grove

Coleraine

Crouch End

Fortis Green

Green Lanes

Harringay

High Cross

Highgate

Hornsey Central

Hornsey Vale

Muswell Hill

Noel Park

Park

Seven Sisters

South Hornsey

South Tottenham

Tottenham Central

West Green

White Hart Lane

Woodside

References

1978
1978 London Borough council elections